Velike Češnjice (in older sources also Velike Črešnjice) is a village northeast of Šentvid pri Stični in the Municipality of Ivančna Gorica in central Slovenia. The area is part of the historical region of Lower Carniola. The municipality is now included in the Central Slovenia Statistical Region. 

The local church built in the northern part of the settlement is dedicated to Saint Anne and belongs to the Parish of Šentvid pri Stični. It was originally a Romanesque and was restyled in the Baroque in the 18th century.

References

External links

Velike Češnjice on Geopedia

Populated places in the Municipality of Ivančna Gorica